San Francisco River may refer to:

North America
San Francisco River (Gila River tributary) – a river of the Gila River Valley in Arizona
Rio de Flag – formerly known as the San Francisco river, originating in the San Francisco Peaks in Arizona
San Francisco Creek – a river and tributary of the Rio Grande in Texas

South America
San Francisco River (Argentina) – a river in Argentina
Río San Francisco – a tributary of the Zamora River in Ecuador
San Francisco River (Bogotá) – a river in Colombia
Fucha River – a tributary of the Bogotá River in Colombia
San Francisco river – a river in San Francisco Gotera, Morazán, El Salvador

Brazil

São Francisco River – the fourth-longest river in Brazil
São Francisco River (Belo River tributary) – a tributary of the Belo River
São Francisco River (Jaciparaná River tributary) – a tributary of the Jaci Paraná River
São Francisco River (São Miguel River tributary) – a tributary of the São Miguel River in Rondônia
São Francisco River (Paraná) – a river that flows into the Paraná River
São Francisco River (Rio de Janeiro)
São Francisco River (Paraíba)
São Francisco River (Jequitinhonha River tributary)

See also
San Francisco Bay – an estuary of several rivers near the city of San Francisco